Phaeomarasmius is a genus of fungi in the family Tubariaceae. It was formerly thought to belong in the family Inocybaceae. The genus has a widespread distribution, and contains about 20 species.

References

External links

Agaricales genera
Tubariaceae